Manna, was a successful Bangladeshi film actor and producer. In his 24 years career he has acted in more than three hundred films.
He earned numerous accolades in his long career, including 1 National Film Award, 3 Meril Prothom Alo Awards, and 5 Bachsas Awards

He earned a Bangladesh National Film Award for Best Actor for his role in the film Bir Soinik (2003).

Rewards and honors 

  National Film Award

He was nominated for several National Film Awards but won one.

 Meril Prothom Alo Award

He was nominated for the Merill-Prothom-alo Award a total of eight times, winning three times.

 Bachsas Awards

He has been nominated for several Bacchus Awards, four times for Best Actor and one posthumously for his contribution to the film industry.

Other awards and honors 
 Asian Journalist Human Rights and Cultural Foundation
  'Winner' : AJHRCF Performance Award 2018 (posthumous)

Building naming 
The video editing, color grading and dubbing studio has been renamed "Manna Digital Complex" in the digital system within the Bangladesh Film Development Corporation for his outstanding contribution to the Bangladesh film industry.

References

External links 
 

National Film Awards (Bangladesh)
National Film Award (Bangladesh) winners
Meril-Prothom Alo Awards
Bachsas Award winners
Meril-Prothom Alo Awards winners